The Australian Figure Skating Championships is a figure skating competition held annually to crown the national champions of Australia. It is organized by Ice Skating Australia, the nation's figure skating governing body. Medals may be awarded in the disciplines of men's singles, ladies' singles, pair skating, ice dancing, and synchronized skating on the senior, junior, and novice levels.

The competition's results are among the criteria used to determine the Australian teams to the World Championships, Four Continents Championships, and World Junior Championships, as well as the Australian national team.

Not every division of every discipline has been held every year due to lack of participants.

Senior medalists

Men

Ladies

Pairs

Ice dancing

Synchronized skating

Junior medalists

Men

Ladies

Pairs

Ice dancing

Synchronized skating

Novice medalists

Men

Ladies

Pairs

Ice dance

Synchronized skating

References

External links
 

 
Figure skating national championships
Figure skating in Australia